"), see Wikipedia:Lua.}}
 

Invoke may refer to:

 Invocation, a form of supplication or prayer
 Invoke Solutions, a market research company founded in 1999 and based in the United States
 Invoke (smart speaker), developed by Harman Kardon and powered by Microsoft's intelligent personal assistant, Cortana
 Invoke Image Display, an IHE Integration Profile that simplifies the task of integrating non-image-aware systems  
 Invoke Malaysia, a Malaysian Non profit organisation founded by People's Justice Party (PKR) vice-president, Rafizi Ramli in 2016
 inv, Python's kind of Make tool

See also
 Invocation (disambiguation)
 Evoke (disambiguation)